The Montreal Symphony Orchestra is a Canadian symphony orchestra based in Montreal, Quebec, Canada.  The orchestra’s home is the Montreal Symphony House at Place des Arts.  It is the only orchestra in the world that possesses an octobass.

History
Several orchestras were precursor ensembles to the current OSM.  One such orchestra was formed in 1897, which lasted ten years, and another was established in 1930, which lasted eleven.  The current orchestra directly traces its roots back to 1934, when Wilfrid Pelletier formed an ensemble called Les Concerts Symphoniques.  This ensemble gave its first concert January 14, 1935, under conductor Rosario Bourdon.  The orchestra acquired its current name in 1954. In the early 1960s, as the Orchestra was preparing to move to new facilities at Place des Arts, patron and prominent Montreal philanthropist, John Wilson McConnell, purchased the 1727 Laub-Petschnikoff Stradivarius violin for Calvin Sieb, the Symphony's concertmaster.

The orchestra has begun touring and some recording in the 1960s and early 1970s, during the tenures of Zubin Mehta and Franz-Paul Decker.  During the music directorship of Rafael Frühbeck de Burgos (1975-1976) the OSM received its first invitation to perform at Carnegie Hall.  However, Frühbeck de Burgos had rejected the composition Fleuves by Gilles Tremblay, which Tremblay had composed for tour performances by the OSM.  In addition, Frühbeck de Burgos was quoted in print in La Presse as expressing public criticism of selected OSM musicians.  The ensuing controversy led to Frühbeck de Burgos' resignation.  (When Frühbeck de Burgos returned as a guest conductor in 2002, he apologised for his earlier behaviour.)

Because of the conducting dates that opened up after Frühbeck de Burgos' departure, one of the slots fell to Charles Dutoit. Dutoit subsequently became music director of the OSM in 1977. Dutoit had struck a friendship with the London/Decca records producer Ray Minshull, which led to a twenty-year recording partnership with Decca/London. During this period, Dutoit and the OSM released many recordings and embarked on tours of North America, Europe, Asia, and South America. Most notable among this discography are the recordings of the French repertoire, especially the music of Maurice Ravel, as well as works of Stravinsky and Debussy.  The OSM and Charles Dutoit have various awards for their recordings, including the Grand Prix du Président de la République (France) and the Prix mondial du Disque de Montreux. The OSM won Grammy awards in 1996 for its recording of Hector Berlioz' Les Troyens and in 2000 for Sergei Prokofiev and Béla Bartók piano concerti with Martha Argerich on EMI. It has additionally won a number of Juno Awards and Felix Awards. The London/Decca recordings ceased in the late 1990s, because of market changes in classical recording industry was turned upside-down. 

In 1998, the OSM musicians took industrial action, which lasted three weeks and was resolved largely due to the personal relationship between Dutoit and Lucien Bouchard, then the premier of Quebec. In 2002, Dutoit abruptly resigned as music director, following a long-simmering dispute between Dutoit and the OSM musicians.  Dutoit did not return to the OSM as a guest conductor until 2016.

Following the departure of Dutoit, Jacques Lacombe served as principal guest conductor of the OSM, from 2002 to 2006. In March 2003, the orchestra announced the appointment Kent Nagano as its new music director, starting in 2006. He gave his first concert in Montreal as music director-designate March 30, 2005. Later in 2005, the OSM's musicians took industrial action, where this work stoppage lasted five months, ending shortly before Nagano's first scheduled concerts. With the OSM, Nagano has conducted commercial recordings for such labels as ECM New Series and Analekta.  In June 2017, the OSM announced that Nagano is to stand down from as its music director at the close of his current contract, at the end of the 2019–2020 season. Nagano concluded his OSM music directorship at the close of the 2019-2020 season, with the scheduled final concerts of his tenure curtailed by the COVID-19 pandemic.

In 2018, the orchestra toured several Cree and Inuit communities in Nord-du-Québec to perform Chaakapesh: The Trickster's Quest, an indigenous opera by Tomson Highway and Matthew Ricketts. The tour was documented by Roger Frappier and Justin Kingsley in the 2019 documentary film Chaakapesh.

In 2018, Rafael Payare first guest-conducted the OSM.  He returned as guest conductor in 2019. In January 2021, the OSM announced the appointment of Payare as its next music director, effective with the 2022-2023 season, with an initial contract of 5 seasons.  He held the title of music director-designate in the 2021-2022 season.

Music directors and leaders

 Wilfrid Pelletier (1935–1940)
 Désiré Defauw (1941–1952)
 Otto Klemperer (1950–1953; Artistic Advisor)    	
 Igor Markevitch (1957–1961)
 Zubin Mehta (1961–1967)
 Franz-Paul Decker (1967–1975)
 Rafael Frühbeck de Burgos (1975–1976)
 Charles Dutoit (1977–2002)
 Kent Nagano (2006–2020)
 Rafael Payare (2022–present)

See also
 List of symphony orchestras
 Canadian classical music
 Culture of Quebec
 List of Quebec musicians
 Music of Quebec
 St. Lawrence Choir
 John Zirbel

References

External links

Orchestre symphonique de Montreal official website

Canadian orchestras

Musical groups established in 1934
Musical groups from Montreal
Juno Award for Classical Album of the Year – Large Ensemble or Soloist(s) with Large Ensemble Accompaniment winners
Tourist attractions in Montreal
Arts organizations established in 1934
1934 establishments in Quebec
Juno Award for Classical Album of the Year – Solo or Chamber Ensemble winners
Juno Award for Classical Album of the Year – Vocal or Choral Performance winners
Félix Award winners